Mugica or Múgica (in Basque Muxika) is a Basque surname. Variations: Mujica, Mújica, Mújico, Mujika, Mugika and Mojica.

Antonio Mugica (born 1974), Venezuelan businessman
Carlos Mugica (1930–1974), Argentine Roman Catholic priest and activist
Francisco Múgica (born 1907), Argentine film director, film editor and cinematographer
René Mugica (1909–1998), Argentine actor, film director and screenwriter
Also:
 Mugica brand of Llama-Gabilondo y Cia SA firearms